Alshaaz Pathan (born 5 July 1994) is an Indian cricketer who plays for Gujarat. He made his first-class debut on 1 December 2015 in the 2015–16 Ranji Trophy.

References

External links
 

1994 births
Living people
Indian cricketers
Gujarat cricketers
Cricketers from Ahmedabad